The 2014 Utah Valley Wolverines softball team represented Utah Valley University in the 2014 NCAA Division I softball season.  Nikki Palmer entered the year in her first season as head coach of the Wolverines.  The Wolverines entered 2014 as new members of the Western Athletic Conference. The Wolverines were picked to finish third in the 2014 WAC standings. After finishing fifth out of six in the WAC Regular season, the Wolverines shocked everyone going 4-0 in the WAC Tournament to earn the conferences automatic bid to the NCAA Tournament. The Wolverines claimed the title of the 64-seed and opened competition in the Eugene region against top seed Oregon. After going 0-2 in the Eugene Regional, the Wolverines ended the season 18-42.

2014 Roster

Schedule 

|-
!colspan=10 style="background:#006633; color:#CFB53B;"| Red Desert Classic

 

|-
!colspan=10 style="background:#006633; color:#CFB53B;"| Easton Desert Classic

|-
!colspan=10 style="background:#006633;" |Louisville Slugger Classic 

|-
!colspan=10 style="background:#006633; color:#CFB53B;"| Regular Season

|-
!colspan=10 style="background:#006633; color:#CFB53B;"| Rebel Spring Games

|-
!colspan=10 style="background:#006633; color:#CFB53B;"| Regular Season

|-
!colspan=10 style="background:#006633;"| 2014 WAC Tournament

|-
!colspan=10 style="background:#006633;"| 2014 NCAA Regionals

TV, Radio, and Streaming Information
All Utah Valley home games were streamed live on YouTube. The games at Utah were streamed online via Utah's Pac-12 Digital Channel, and the games at BYU were shown live on BYUtv. The NCAA Regional game vs. Oregon was shown nationwide on Pac-12 Network.

References 

Utah Valley
Utah Valley Wolverines softball seasons
Utah Valley softball